The Wicklow Postman is a musical play with a book by Mark Price and music and lyrics mostly by Eugene O'Rourke and
B.H. Janssen, that was popular in the 1890s. It was a vehicle for O'Rourke, an Irish comedian, who played the title role.

Productions 
A production opened in Boston, Massachusetts, in September 1892.  The New York production, produced by Lee Harrison, was playing (at least) in the week of April 30, 1893, at H. R. Jacobs' Third Avenue Theatre.

The show opened in Chicago on August 19, 1895, with O'Rourke and Bettina Girard in the female supporting role. In 1896, O'Rourke was still touring in the show, appearing in London, Ontario, Canada.

Songs 
Based on published sheet music, the songs included were:

 "At the Setting of the Sun"
 "Don't Forget to Send More Me"
 "It All Comes In the Post" (music and lyrics by B. H. Janssen)
 "I Wish They'd Do It Now" (music and lyrics by B. H. Janssen)
 "Just the Girl for Me"
 "Norah" (music by Eugene O'Rourke, lyrics by Albert Hall)
 "The Eyes That I Love Best" (music and lyrics by B. H. Janssen)

References 

1893 musicals